John Pentecost may refer to:
John Pentecost (cricketer) (born 1857), Kent cricketer
 J. Dwight Pentecost (1915–2014), American Christian theologian
John Pentecost (American football) (born 1943), offensive guard for the Minnesota Vikings

See also
 John L. Pentecost House, a historic residence located in Elmhurst, Illinois